The small lappet moth (Phyllodesma ilicifolia) is a moth in the family Lasiocampidae. The species was first described by Carl Linnaeus in his 1758 10th edition of Systema Naturae. It is found throughout Europe and parts of Asia.

Description
From Meyrick L. 35–40 mm. Forewings with 9 to apex; brownish-ferruginous, slightly whitish-sprinkled; first and second lines dark grey, waved, interrupted, curved near costa; a dark grey discal mark, preceded by a whitish suffusion; a broad terminal band of whitish irroration, including a darker interrupted line, not reaching costa; cilia white, barred with dark ferruginous. Hindwings purplish-fuscous; two suffused whitish bands; 8 connected with 7, with one or two pseudoneuria. Larva grey or reddish, hairs reddish; dorsal line black, interrupted with reddish, edged with whitish; lateral blue-grey, interrupted.

Distribution and habitat
The moth is found in Austria, Belarus, Belgium, China, Czech Republic, Denmark, Estonia, Finland, France, Germany, Italy, Malta, Japan, Kazakhstan, Latvia, Lithuania, Mongolia, Norway, Poland, Romania, Russia, Slovakia, Spain, Sweden, Switzerland, and Ukraine.

Life cycle and behaviour
The larva feeds on Vaccinium and Salix and hibernates as a pupa within a cocoon. The adult emerges in spring, flies at night in summer and lays its eggs in batches.

See also
 Gastropacha quercifolia (lappet moth)

References

External links

Lepiforum e.V.

Lasiocampidae
Moths described in 1758
Moths of Europe
Taxa named by Carl Linnaeus
Taxonomy articles created by Polbot